To Celebrate Christmas is the first solo Christmas and third solo studio album by American country music artist Jennifer Nettles, released on October 28, 2016, through Big Machine Records. This is the first Christmas-themed album for Nettles as a solo artist, after previously releasing Gold and Green with Sugarland in 2009.

Track listing

Personnel

Musicians
 Jennifer Nettles – lead vocals
 Tim Lauer – keyboards (1–4, 6–9), accordion (5), acoustic piano (10), arrangements 
 Tom Bukovac – electric guitars (1–4, 6–9)
 Danny Rader – acoustic guitars (1–9)
 Paul Franklin – pedal steel guitar (1, 3, 4, 6–9), dobro (2)
 Jimmie Lee Sloas – bass guitar (1–3, 6, 7, 9)
 Dorian Crozier – drums (1–4, 6–9)
 Sam Levine – baritone saxophone (1, 4, 8)
 Jim Hoke – tenor saxophone (1, 4, 8), horn arrangements (1, 2, 4, 8), clarinet (2)
 Roy Agee – trombone (1, 4, 8)
 Steve Herrman – trumpet (1, 2, 4, 8)
 Steve Patrick – trumpet (1, 4, 8)
 Alfreda McCrary-Lee – backing vocals (1)
 Ann McCrary – backing vocals (1)
 Regina McCrary – backing vocals (1)
 Deborah Person – backing vocals (1)
 Andra Day – lead vocals (2)
 Whitney Coleman – backing vocals (2, 4, 6–9)
 Jeffrey Holstein – backing vocals (2, 4, 6–9)
 Kiely Phillips – backing vocals (2, 4, 6–9)
 Idina Menzel – lead vocals (3)

Technical personnel
 Nicole Dovolis – A&R
 Julian Raymond – producer, arrangements 
 Howard Willing – recording 
 Seth Morton – recording assistant (1, 2, 4, 6, 9)
 Owen Lewis – recording assistant (1, 2, 4, 6–9)
 Jason Mott – recording assistant (3, 7, 8)
 Adam Chagnon – additional engineer
 Chris Lord-Alge – mixing
 Nik Karpen – mix assistant 
 Lars Fox – editing
 Ted Jensen – mastering at Sterling Sound (New York City, New York)
 Laurel Kittleson – production coordinator
 Doug Rich – production coordinator
 Janice Soled – production coordinator
 Brianna Steinitz – production coordinator
 Sandi Spika Borchetta – art direction
 Becky Reiser – art direction
 Justin Ford – graphic design
 Marc Baptiste – photography
 Hayley Atkin – wardrobe

Charts
To Celebrate Christmas debuted at No. 151 on the Billboard 200, selling 4,700 copies in its first week of release. As of November 2017, the album has sold 59,900 copies in the US.

Weekly charts

Year-end charts

Release history

References

2016 Christmas albums
Christmas albums by American artists
Country Christmas albums
Jennifer Nettles albums
Big Machine Records albums
Albums produced by Julian Raymond